The Parable of the Invisible Gardener is a tale originally told by John Wisdom. It was later developed in the university debate by Antony Flew, who made several important alterations such as changing the gardeners to explorers and making the original "long neglected garden" a clearing in the jungle. It is often used to illustrate the perceived differences between assertions based on faith and assertions based on scientific evidence, and the problems associated with unfalsifiable beliefs. Flew's main claim in using the parable is that religious believers do not allow anybody to "falsify" their assertions, instead they simply change their beliefs to suit the questioner. Thus Flew concludes that religious believers cause God to "die the death of a thousand qualifications". In Flew's version, the tale runs as follows:

Once upon a time two explorers came upon a clearing in the jungle. In the clearing were growing many flowers and many weeds. One explorer says, "Some gardener must tend this plot." The other disagrees, "There is no gardener." So they pitch their tents and set a watch. No gardener is ever seen. "But perhaps he is an invisible gardener." So they set up a barbed-wire fence. They electrify it. They patrol with bloodhounds. (For they remember how H. G. Well's The Invisible Man could be both smelt and touched though he could not be seen.) But no shrieks ever suggest that some intruder has received a shock. No movements of the wire ever betray an invisible climber. The bloodhounds never give cry. Yet still the Believer is not convinced. "But there is a gardener, invisible, intangible, insensible to electric shocks, a gardener who has no scent and makes no sound, a gardener who comes secretly to look after the garden which he loves." At last the Skeptic despairs, "But what remains of your original assertion? Just how does what you call an invisible, intangible, eternally elusive gardener differ from an imaginary gardener or even from no gardener at all?"

Notes

References
 Antony Flew, R. M. Hare & Basil Mitchell, “Theology and falsification: the University discussion” in New Essays in Philosophical Theology. New York, Macmillan (1964) 
 John Wisdom, "Gods", Proceedings of the Aristotelian Society, 1944–5, reprinted as Chap. X of Antony Flew, ed., Essays in Logic and Language, First Series (Blackwell, 1951), and in Wisdom's own Philosophy and Psychoanalysis (Blackwell, 1953).

Philosophical arguments
Philosophy of religion